This is a list of awards and nominations for the television drama series Hart to Hart (1979–1984).

By award

American Cinema Editors
1979: Best Edited Episode – TV Series (Bob Bring for "Max in Love", nominated)

Emmy Awards
1980: Outstanding Art Direction – Series (for "Man with Jade Eyes", nominated)
1981: Outstanding Actress – Drama Series (Stefanie Powers for playing "Jennifer Hart", nominated)
1981: Outstanding Art Direction – Series (for "Blue Chip Murders", nominated)
1981: Outstanding Film Sound Mixing (for "Tis the Season to be Murdered", nominated)
1982: Outstanding Actress – Drama Series (Powers, nominated)
1982: Outstanding Art Direction – Series (for "The Hart of the Matter", nominated)

Golden Globe Awards
1979: Best Actor – Drama Series (Robert Wagner for playing "Jonathan Hart", nominated)
1979: Best Actress – Drama Series (Stefanie Powers for playing "Jennifer Hart", nominated)
1980: Best Actor – Drama Series (Wagner, nominated)
1980: Best Actress – Drama Series (Powers, nominated)
1980: Best Series – Drama (nominated)
1981: Best Actress – Drama Series (Powers, nominated)
1981: Best Series – Drama (nominated)
1982: Best Actor – Drama Series (Wagner, nominated)
1982: Best Actress – Drama Series (Powers, nominated)
1982: Best Series – Drama (nominated)
1982: Best Supporting Actor – (Mini)Series or TV Film (Lionel Stander for playing "Max", won)
1983: Best Actor – Drama Series (Wagner, nominated)
1983: Best Actress – Drama Series (Powers, nominated)
1983: Best Series – Drama (nominated)

People's Choice Awards
1979: Favorite New TV Dramatic Program (won)

Young Artist Awards
1983: Best Young Actress, Guest on a Series (Roxana Zal for playing "Riley", won)
1983: Best Young Actor, Guest on a Series (Rossie Harris for playing "Jess", nominated)

Hart to Hart